Ministry of the Interior and Administration is an administration structure controlling main administration and security branches of the Polish government. After Parliamentary Election on 9 October 2011 was transformed for two ministries: Ministry of Interior (Minister: Jacek Cichocki) and Ministry of Administration and Digitization (Minister: Michał Boni). It was recreated in late 2015.

History and function
The ministry was founded in 1918 as the Ministry of Internal Affairs (Ministerstwo Spraw Wewnętrznych). During a reform of the Polish government in 1996 the administration branch was merged into the Ministry and it was renamed to its current name (on 24 December).

That was one of the most important governmental cabinet positions in Poland, The ministry was responsible for the following:

 The general interior security of the country, with respect to criminal acts or natural catastrophes
 including the major law-enforcement forces (see law enforcement in Poland)
 the Polish National Police (Policja)
 the Polish Border Guard (Straż Graniczna)
 Civil defence
 the State Fire Brigade (Straż Pożarna)
 Search and rescue and the oversight of ambulance services
 the granting of identity documents (Polish passports, identity cards) and driving licenses through the network of voivodeships
 relations between the central government and local governments (except in the case of regional development, which is undertaken by the Ministry of Regional Development
 logistics and organization of political elections, at the national and voivodeship levels (but the results of the elections are overseen by the Supreme Court of Poland)
 regulation of immigration and preventing illegal immigration
 integration and registration of legal immigrants

While the ministry of the Interior supervises police forces, it does not supervise criminal enquiries; criminal enquiries are conducted under the supervision of the judiciary.

The Ministry's headquarters was located on the Stefan Batory Street, south of Warsaw's city centre and the governmental district which surrounds the Belweder. The Ministry could be referred to by its initials 'MSWiA'.

The last Minister of the Interior and Administration before it was split in 2011 was Jerzy Miller.

List of ministers

Ministers of Internal Affairs of the Second Republic of Poland (1918 - 1939)

Ministers of Internal Affairs of Third Polish Republic
 Krzysztof Kozłowski (non-partisan) 6 July 1990 – 14 December 1990
 Henryk Majewski (non-partisan) 12 January 1991 – 5 December 1991
 Antoni Macierewicz 23 December 1991 – 5 June 1992
 Andrzej Milczanowski 11 July 1992 – 22 December 1995
 Jerzy Konieczny 29 December 1995 – 26 January 1996
 Zbigniew Siemiątkowski (SLD) 15 February 1996 – 4 February 1997
Replaced by the Minister of Internal Affairs and Administration (1997)

Office reestablished (2011)
 Jacek Cichocki 18 November 2011 – 25 February 2013
 Bartłomiej Sienkiewicz 25 February 2013 – 22 September 2014
 Teresa Piotrowska (PO) 22 September 2014 – 16 November 2015
Replaced by the Minister of Internal Affairs and Administration (2015)

Ministers of Internal Affairs and Administration of Third Polish Republic
 Leszek Miller (SLD) 1 January 1997 – 17 October 1997
 Janusz Tomaszewski (AWS) 31 October 1997 – 3 September 1999
 Marek Biernacki (AWS) 7 October 1999 – 19 October 2001
 Krzysztof Janik (SLD) 19 October 2001 – 21 January 2004
 Józef Oleksy (SLD) 21 January 2004 – 21 April 2004
 Jerzy Szmajdziński (SLD) 21 April 2004 – 2 May 2004
 Ryszard Kalisz (SLD) 2 May 2004 – 31 October 2005
 Ludwik Dorn (PiS) 31 October 2005 – 7 February 2007
 Janusz Kaczmarek (independent) 8 February 2007 – 8 August 2007
 Władysław Stasiak (independent) 8 August 2007 – 16 November 2007
 Grzegorz Schetyna (PO) 16 November 2007 – 13 October 2009
 Jerzy Miller (PO) 14 October 2009 – 17 November 2011
Replaced by the Minister of Internal Affairs (2011)

Office reestablished (2015)
 Mariusz Błaszczak (PIS) 16 November 2015 – 9 January 2018
 Joachim Brudziński (PIS) 9 January 2018 –  4 June 2019
 Elżbieta Witek (PIS) 4 June 2019 – 9 August 2019
 Mariusz Kamiński (PIS) since 14 August 2019

References

Poland
Internal Affairs and Administration
Poland, Internal affairs